Charles A. Griffin (January 24, 1884 - ?) was a state legislator in Illinois. He was born in Bellaire, Ohio and moved to Chicago after high school. He served in the Illinois House of Representatives from 1925 to 1929. A Republican, he advocated for civil rights, helped establish a community center and YMCA and was involved in fraternal organizations.

He married and had two children.

See also
List of African-American officeholders (1900–1959)

References

1884 births
Year of death missing
African-American men in politics
People from Bellaire, Ohio
Politicians from Chicago
American civil rights activists
African-American state legislators in Illinois
Republican Party members of the Illinois House of Representatives